Isabelle Wiebach (born 14 June 1994) is a Liechtensteiner footballer who plays as a defender for Widnau and the Liechtenstein national football team.

Career statistics

International

References

1994 births
Living people
Women's association football defenders
Liechtenstein women's international footballers
Liechtenstein women's footballers